Frank Clayton may refer to:

People
Frank Clayton (Otago cricketer) (1866–1944), New Zealand cricketer
Frank Clayton (Canterbury cricketer) (1866–1941), New Zealand cricketer
Frank Clayton (American football) in 1955 NFL Draft

Fictional characters
Frank Clayton (Emmerdale), fictional character from the British soap opera Emmerdale
Frank Clayton, character in Saratoga (film)
Frank Clayton, character in Pleasures of the Rich

See also
Francis Clayton (disambiguation)